Dutywa, also known as Idutywa, is a town in Mbashe Local Municipality, Eastern Cape province, South Africa, that was founded in 1858 as a military fort after a dispute between a Natal Colony raiding party and its local people. It is named after the Dutywa River, a tributary of the Mbhashe River. The name means "place of disorder" in the Xhosa language; its spelling was officially changed from "Idutywa" to "Dutywa" on 16 July 2004. The settlement was laid out in 1884 and was made a municipality in 1913. The town is the birthplace of former South African President, Thabo Mbeki.

Dutywa is home to 11,076 people, 96.6% of who are Black African (Xhosa).

Idutywa School of Excellence is a recognized school well known for producing excellent results for high pass rate in Matric. 

The is Idutywa Mall was built so that the villagers would be able to do their shopping.

References

Populated places in the Mbhashe Local Municipality
Transkei
Populated places established in 1858